Studio Tour may refer to one of the following:

 Hollywood Pictures Backlot Tour, an attraction in Hollywood Land at Disney California Adventure at Disneyland in Anaheim, California
 Fox Studio Tour Hollywood, an attraction at Fox Movie World U.S.A. in Costa Mesa, California
 Studio Tour, an attraction at Universal Studios Hollywood
 Warner Bros. Studio Tour Hollywood, an attraction at Warner Bros. Movie World U.S.A. in Los Angeles, California
 Warner Bros. Studio Tour London - The Making of Harry Potter, an attraction in Leavesden, England
 Fox Studio Tour London - The Making of Star Wars, an attraction in London, England
 Studio Backlot Tour, a former attraction at Walt Disney World, Florida
 Production Studio Tour (Universal Studios Florida), a former attraction at Universal Studios Florida
 Studio Tram Tour: Behind the Magic, an attraction at Disneyland Paris
 Warner Bros. Studio Tour, a current attraction at Warner Bros. Movie World which toured the nearby Village Roadshow Studios in Australia and Warner Bros. Movie World U.S.A. in Los Angeles, California and Fox Movie World U.S.A. in Costa Mesa, California
 Fox Studio Tour, a current attraction at Fox Studios Australia which toured the nearby Fox Studios Australia in Australia and Warner Bros. Movie World U.S.A. in Los Angeles, California